Carcinoma ex pleomorphic adenoma (ca ex PA) is a type of cancer typically found in the parotid gland. It arises from the benign tumour pleomorphic adenoma.

Its prognosis depends on the stage. Early tumours have essentially a benign behaviour.

Signs and symptoms
The signs and symptoms are similar to other malignant salivary gland tumours; however, it may have been preceded by an appreciable mass that was long-standing and did not appear to be growing.
 
Findings that suggest a malignant salivary gland tumour include rapid growth, facial weakness (due to facial nerve compression), pain, skin ulceration, fixation of the mastoid tip
and parasthesias.

Diagnosis
Carcinoma ex pleomorphic adenoma is diagnosed by examining it under the microscope with consideration of the individual history.

In approximately 75% of cases ca ex PAs arise in a pleomorphic adenoma that is apparent when the tumour is excised. In the other approximately 25% of cases the individual had a pleomorphic adenoma excised previously and the diagnosis is made based on (1) the presence of a carcinoma, and (2) the history of a pleomorphic adenoma at that location.

See also
Salivary gland
Pleomorphic adenoma

References

External links 

Glandular and epithelial neoplasia